Phulaut is one of the villages in Chousa block, Madhepura district in the Indian state of Bihar. It is situated and connected by NH 106. It is located at a distance of 55 km from the district headquarters Madhepura.This is a beautiful village, its specialty is that there is Kosi river all around it and it is a small village in the middle and there are 4 bridges to and from the village, H2 bridge NH-106, which is plowed by a road.   and second road is along Kishunganj direction and at present a 4 line bridge is being constructed which goes from Phulaut to Bihpur. People of this village will get a lot of facilities. Here is the longest bridge of Bihar, so there are many temples in the village. There are many temples like Durga Mandir, Dhumavati Mandir, Jawalamukhi Mandir, Hanuman Mandir and many other caste people live here and the biggest feature of the village is the school here, there are 3 middle schools and 1 high school, which is famous in its district. The teachers of the school here are very educated and eligible , among whom Raman Kumar Singh is famous, whom the children know by the name of Raman Sir. This village itself is very prosperous. This fair is held every year in the month of December in the name of Jaisingh Baba which is amazing and attractive ! (By King krishna from phulaut ward no 3)

Geography
Phulaut is divided into two Panchayat Poorvi and Paschimi panchayat. This village is blessed by Two Goddess Maa Jwalamukhi(Bhagwati) and Maa Dhumavati. The famous Maa Jwalamukhi Sthan situated at the heart of village.

Kosi river passes through near the village. The village is surrounded by flood of Kosi during rainy season and facing the onslaughts of the Kosi river. The history of Phulaut is repleted with tales of owes, sorrow and sufferings. Since time immemorial, it has seen several ups and downs perpetuated by Kosi in the form of flood.

Location
Phulaut is located at Phulaut-village in Wikimapia.

Nearby cities: Bhagalpur, Bihpur and Bihariganj.

Phulaut is by far biggest and most populated village in Madhepura district.

Population
The total population of the village is 15,454. The literacy rate is 28.5% and female literacy rate is 16.53% as per 2001 census. The number of households in Phulaut is 2,620. Female to male ratio of Phulaut is 89.02%. Female to male ratio of the village is less than state's female to male ratio 91.93%.

References

Villages in Madhepura district